Pheidole simplispinosa is a species of ant native to the forests of Fiji.

References

Further reading

External links
Pheidole simplispinosa at PLAZI

simplispinosa
Insects described in 2008